Marie Dargan is a camogie player, Young Player of the Year award winner in 2006 and member of the Kilkenny team for the 2010 National League final.

References

Living people
Kilkenny camogie players
Year of birth missing (living people)
Waterford IT camogie players